Merrill Municipal Airport  is a city owned public use airport located one nautical mile (2 km) northwest of the central business district of Merrill, a city in Lincoln County, Wisconsin, United States. It is included in the Federal Aviation Administration (FAA) National Plan of Integrated Airport Systems for 2021–2025, in which it is categorized as a local general aviation facility.

Facilities and aircraft 
Merrill Municipal Airport covers an area of 439 acres (178 ha) at an elevation of 1,318 feet (402 m) above mean sea level. It has two runways with asphalt surfaces: 7/25 is 5,100 by 75 feet (1,554 x 23 m) with approved GPS approaches and 16/34 is 2,997 by 75 feet (913 x 23 m). The Merrill NDB navaid, (RRL) frequency 257 kHz, is located on the field.

For the 12-month period ending August 6, 2020, the airport had 18,710 aircraft operations, an average of 51 per day: 96% general aviation, 4% air taxi and less than 1% military. In February 2023, there were 40 aircraft based at this airport: 39 single-engine and 1 multi-engine.

See also 
 List of airports in Wisconsin

References

External links 
 Airport page at City of Merrill website
  at Wisconsin DOT Airport Directory
 

Airports in Wisconsin
Transportation in Lincoln County, Wisconsin